The 3 arrondissements of the Meuse department are:

 Arrondissement of Bar-le-Duc, (prefecture of the Meuse department: Bar-le-Duc) with 110 communes.  The population of the arrondissement was 59,980 in 2016.  
 Arrondissement of Commercy, (subprefecture: Commercy) with 135 communes. The population of the arrondissement was 43,511 in 2016.
 Arrondissement of Verdun, (subprefecture: Verdun) with 254 communes. The population of the arrondissement was 85,564 in 2016.

History

In 1800 the arrondissements of Bar-le-Duc, Commercy, Montmédy and Verdun were established. The arrondissement of Montmédy was disbanded in 1926.

References

Meuse